Lamproxynella is a genus of tephritid  or fruit flies in the family Tephritidae.

Species
Lamproxynella apotela (Hendel, 1914)
Lamproxynella dyscola (Hendel, 1914)
Lamproxynella euarestina (Hendel, 1914)
Lamproxynella fucatella (Hendel, 1914)
Lamproxynella heliodes (Hendel, 1914)
Lamproxynella marmorata (Blanchard, 1854)
Lamproxynella separata (Malloch, 1933)
Lamproxynella unicolor (Walker, 1836)

References

Tephritinae
Tephritidae genera
Diptera of South America